Roselea is a building in Luss, Argyll and Bute, Scotland. It is a Category B listed structure dating to the mid 19th century.

The building, a single-storey cottage located on Pier Road, is made of whinstone and sandstone rubble with pink sandstone margins and dressings. It has projecting bracketed eaves. It possesses timber diamond-pane casement windows and octagonal ridge chimney stacks with octagonal cans. It is a variant of the common form of cottage found elsewhere on the street.

The building is shown on the first-edition Ordnance Survey map, surveyed in 1864.

See also
List of listed buildings in Luss, Argyll and Bute

References

External links
View of the building – Google Street View, October 2016

19th-century establishments in Scotland
Listed buildings in Luss, Argyll and Bute
Category B listed buildings in Argyll and Bute